Hand of God is an American drama streaming television series created by Ben Watkins. The premiere episode is one of two drama pilots that Amazon streamed online in August 2014, along with Hysteria. Viewers were allowed to offer their opinions about the pilot before the studio decided whether or not to place an order for the entire series. In October 2014, Hand of God was ordered to full series by Amazon Studios.

The series officially premiered on September 4, 2015. A second season was ordered in December 2015, which premiered on March 10, 2017. On September 15, 2016, Amazon Studios announced that the series would end after the second season.

Plot
Hand of God follows Pernell Harris (Ron Perlman), a corrupt judge who suffers a breakdown and believes that God is compelling him onto a path of vigilante justice. He becomes a member of a church called Hand of God, which proves to be a dangerous cult.

Cast

Main
 Ron Perlman as Pernell Harris
 Dana Delany as Crystal Harris
 Andre Royo as Robert "Bobo" Boston
 Garret Dillahunt as KD
 Alona Tal as Jocelyn Harris
 Emayatzy Corinealdi as Tessie Graham
 Julian Morris as Paul Curtis
 Elizabeth McLaughlin as Alicia Hopkins

Recurring

 Johnny Ferro as PJ Harris (Pernell Jr.)
 Cleavon McClendon as Asa Boston
 Maximiliano Hernández as Chief Toby Clay
 Jimmy Ray Bennett as Nathan Brooks
 Elaine Tan as Anne Wu
 Erykah Badu as April
 Jon Tenney as Nick Tramble
 Hunter Parrish as Josh Miller
 Nia Long as Izzy
 Sandy Martin as Randy
 Tommy Day Carey as Detective Warren
 Anthony Starke as DA Gilbert McCauley
 Camryn Manheim as Dr. Langston
 Linda Gray as Aunt Val
 Brian Baumgartner as Dr. Olonari
 Guy Burnet as Raymond Kelly
 Eric J. Krueger as Adam Rieders

Episodes

Season 1 (2014–2015)

Season 2 (2017)

Reception
The series has received mixed reviews from critics. On Metacritic, the first season has a metascore of 44 out of 100 based on 19 critics reviews, and an 8.2/10 from IGN. The average rating on TV.com is 8.3 out of 10 based on 33 ratings.

Emily VanDerWerff of Vox called the show "mind-bogglingly bad". Mike Hale of The New York Times wrote that it "loses its focus" and that it feels "attenuated and static". Mary McNamara of the Los Angeles Times gave the series a negative review, writing that it had great acting but "little else". David Sims of The Atlantic wrote that the climax of the series didn't "justify 10 depressing hours of television". In contrast, Robert Rorke of the NY Post called the show "oddly compelling", while Tirdad Derakhshani of The Philadelphia Inquirer wrote, "It's such an engaging, original, quirky, and thought-provoking drama, it should be seen."

References

External links
 

2010s American drama television series
2014 American television series debuts
2017 American television series endings
Amazon Prime Video original programming
Television series by Universal Television
Vigilante television series